Golem is a 2000 Italian film directed by Louis Nero.

Cast
Marco Giachino: Golem
Antonio Villella: First Keeper
Savino Genovese: Second Keeper
Vincenzo Fiorito: Rabbi Loew
Aidi Tamburrino: Ballerina
Eloisa Perone: Mask
Ruby Cruz: Young Girl

References

External links
 
 

Italian drama films
2000 films
Films directed by Louis Nero
2000s Italian films